Weston-super-Mare railway station served the town of Weston-super-Mare, Somerset, England, from 1897 to 1940 on the Weston, Clevedon and Portishead Railway.

History 
The station opened on 1 December 1897 by the Weston, Clevedon and Portishead Railway. It had toilets and a waiting room. The platform was ten inches high until raised in 1919. The railway was intended to carry on past this station but the track was removed after a dispute with the council. The station closed on 20 May 1940. A florists occupies the site of the booking office while a footpath follows part of the trackbed.

References

External links 

Disused railway stations in Somerset
Railway stations in Great Britain opened in 1897
Railway stations in Great Britain closed in 1940
1897 establishments in England
1940 disestablishments in England